Urgleptes mixtus is a species of beetle in the family Cerambycidae. It was described by Bates in 1881.

References

Urgleptes
Beetles described in 1881